Ceratophyllus igii is a species of flea in the family Ceratophyllidae. It was described by Darskaya and Shiranovich in 1971.

References 

Ceratophyllidae
Insects described in 1971